is a Japanese mixed martial artist who competes in the Lightweight division. He has formerly competed for the UFC, Shooto, DREAM, and Pancrase.

Mixed martial arts career

Early career
Hironaka made his professional mixed martial arts debut in 2001 for the Shooto promotion and compiled a record of 10-2 with notable wins over Nick Diaz, Ryan Schultz, and Renato Verissimo before being signed by the UFC.

Ultimate Fighting Championship
Hironaka made his UFC debut at UFC 64 on October 14, 2006 against Jon Fitch. Hironaka lost via unanimous decision.

In his next appearance at UFC Fight Night 9, Hironaka defeated Forrest Petz via unanimous decision.

Hironaka then fought Thiago Alves at UFC Fight Night 11 and was defeated via TKO in the second round.

Hironaka faced Canadian Jonathan Goulet at UFC 83 and was defeated in the second round via TKO. Hironaka was then released from the promotion.

Post-UFC
In his first fight since his release from the UFC, Hironaka defeated Motoki Miyazawa at Dream 5 via TKO due to a cut. Hironaka then faced Hayato Sakurai at Dream 6 and was defeated via unanimous decision.

After the loss to Sakurai, Hironaka dropped down to the Lightweight division and won his next four consecutive fights, capturing the Cage Force Lightweight Championship after it had been vacated by Mizuto Hirota.

After dropping two consecutive losses to Katsunori Kikuno and Satoru Kitaoka, respectively, Hironaka bounced back with two consecutive wins, warranting a title shot for the newly vacated Shooto World Lightweight Championship against Kotetsu Boku. Hironaka won via unanimous decision, and then defended his title against Giovani Diniz via first-round TKO.

Hironaka then fought at Pancrase: 257 on March 30, 2014 against Isao Kobayashi. Hironaka was defeated via TKO in the third round.

Grappling career
In 2004, Hironaka fought against Shinya Aoki in a superfight at the Reversal Cup. Hironaka was submitted with a flying armbar that broke his arm, preventing him from competing for several months.

Kickboxing record

|-
|-  bgcolor="#CCFFCC"
| 2013-11-15 || Win ||align=left| Bovy Sor Udomson || Shoot Boxing Battle Summit Ground Zero Tokyo 2013, Final || Tokyo, Japan || KO (right cross) || 2 || || 2-1
|-
|-  bgcolor="#FFBBBB"
| 2011-02-19 || Loss ||align=left| Satoru Suzuki || Shootboxing 2011: Act 1 || Tokyo, Japan || TKO (right hook) || 1 || 1:55 || 1-1
|-
|-  bgcolor="#CCFFCC"
| 2010-02-13 || Win ||align=left| Shinichiro Kuroki || Shoot Boxing 25th Anniversary || Tokyo, Japan || KO (punches) || 2 || 2:24 || 1-0
|-
|-
| colspan=9 | Legend:

Mixed martial arts record

|-
| Win
| align=center| 23–9
| Dong Hyun Ma
| Submission (arm-triangle choke)
| Vale Tudo Japan: VTJ 6th
| 
| align=center| 2
| align=center| 2:33
| Tokyo, Japan
|
|-
| Loss
| align=center| 22–9
| Isao Kobayashi
| TKO (punch and soccer kick)
| Pancrase: 257
| 
| align=center| 3
| align=center| 3:58
| Yokohama, Kanagawa, Japan
|
|-
| Win
| align=center| 22–8
| Yoshihiro Koyama
| Submission (armbar)
| Shooto: 4th Round 2013
| 
| align=center| 4
| align=center| 3:46
| Tokyo, Japan
|
|-
| Win
| align=center| 21–8
| Carlo Prater
| Decision (unanimous)
| Vale Tudo Japan: VTJ 1st
| 
| align=center| 3
| align=center| 5:00
| Tokyo, Japan
|
|-
| Win
| align=center| 20–8
| Giovani Diniz
| TKO (punches)
| Shooto: 5th Round
| 
| align=center| 1
| align=center| 4:05
| Tokyo, Japan
| 
|-
| Win
| align=center| 19–8
| Kotetsu Boku
| Decision (unanimous)
| Shooto: Shootor's Legacy 3
| 
| align=center| 3
| align=center| 5:00
| Osaka, Japan
| 
|-
| Win
| align=center| 18–8
| Takashi Nakakura
| Decision (unanimous)
| Shooto: Shooto Tradition 2011
| 
| align=center| 3
| align=center| 5:00
| Osaka, Japan
| 
|-
| Win
| align=center| 17–8
| Kiyonobu Nishikata
| Submission (rear-naked choke)
| GCM: Demolition West in Yamaguchi 2
| 
| align=center| 1
| align=center| 1:52
| Osaka, Japan
| 
|-
| Loss
| align=center| 16–8
| Satoru Kitaoka
| Submission (guillotine choke)
| Pancrase: Passion Tour 9
| 
| align=center| 2
| align=center| 4:22
| Tokyo, Japan
| 
|-
| Loss
| align=center| 16–7
| Katsunori Kikuno
| KO (punch)
| Dream 13
| 
| align=center| 1
| align=center| 1:26
| Yokohama, Japan
| 
|-
| Win
| align=center| 16–6
| Won Sik Park
| TKO (corner stoppage)
| Dream 12
| 
| align=center| 1
| align=center| 5:00
| Osaka, Japan
| 
|-
| Win
| align=center| 15–6
| Yoshihiro Koyama
| TKO (punches)
| Cage Force
| 
| align=center| 1
| align=center| 4:27
| Tokyo, Japan
| 
|-
| Win
| align=center| 14–6
| Katsuhiko Nagata
| TKO (punches)
| Cage Force
| 
| align=center| 1
| align=center| 3:41
| Tokyo, Japan
| 
|-
| Win
| align=center| 13–6
| Naoyuki Kotani
| Submission (reverse full-nelson)
| ZST
| 
| align=center| 2
| align=center| 2:43
| Tokyo, Japan
| 
|-
| Loss
| align=center| 12–6
| Hayato Sakurai
| Decision (unanimous)
| Dream 6: Middleweight Grand Prix 2008 Final Round
| 
| align=center| 2
| align=center| 5:00
| Saitama, Saitama, Japan
| 
|-
| Win
| align=center| 12–5
| Motoki Miyazawa
| TKO (cut)
| Dream 5: Lightweight Grand Prix 2008 Final Round
| 
| align=center| 1
| align=center| 8:57
| Osaka, Japan
| 
|-
| Loss
| align=center| 11–5
| Jonathan Goulet
| TKO (punches)
| UFC 83
| 
| align=center| 2
| align=center| 2:07
| Montreal, Quebec, Canada
| 
|-
| Loss
| align=center| 11–4
| Thiago Alves
| TKO (punch and knee)
| UFC Fight Night 11
| 
| align=center| 2
| align=center| 4:04
| Nevada, United States
| 
|-
| Win
| align=center| 11–3
| Forrest Petz
| Decision (unanimous)
| UFC Fight Night: Stevenson vs. Guillard
| 
| align=center| 3
| align=center| 5:00
| Nevada, United States
| 
|-
| Loss
| align=center| 10–3
| Jon Fitch
| Decision (unanimous)
| UFC 64: Unstoppable
| 
| align=center| 3
| align=center| 5:00
| Nevada, United States
| 
|-
| Win
| align=center| 10–2
| Renato Verissimo
| TKO (strikes)
| ROTR 9: Rumble on the Rock 9
| 
| align=center| 2
| align=center| 3:03
| Hawaii, United States
| 
|-
| Win
| align=center| 9–2
| Ryan Schultz
| Submission (armbar)
| MARS: MARS
| 
| align=center| 2
| align=center| 1:40
| Tokyo, Japan
| 
|-
| Win
| align=center| 8–2
| Takuya Wada
| Submission (triangle choke)
| GCM: D.O.G. 4
| 
| align=center| 1
| align=center| 4:29
| Tokyo, Japan
| 
|-
| Loss
| align=center| 7–2
| Shinya Aoki
| TKO (cut)
| Shooto 2005: 11/6 in Korakuen Hall
| 
| align=center| 1
| align=center| 2:10
| Tokyo, Japan
| 
|-
| Win
| align=center| 7–1
| Ramunas Komas
| Decision
| Shooto Lithuania: Bushido
| 
| align=center| N/A
| 
| Lithuania
| 
|-
| Win
| align=center| 6–1
| Mark Moreno
| Submission (neck crank)
| SB 29: SuperBrawl 29
| 
| align=center| 1
| align=center| 2:50
| Hawaii, United States
| 
|-
| Win
| align=center| 5–1
| Nick Diaz
| Decision (split)
| Shooto: Year End Show 2002
| 
| align=center| 3
| align=center| 5:00
| Tokyo, Japan
| 
|-
| Win
| align=center| 4–1
| Yasuyuki Tokuoka
| Decision (unanimous)
| Shooto: Treasure Hunt 11
| 
| align=center| 2
| align=center| 5:00
| Tokyo, Japan
| 
|-
| Win
| align=center| 3–1
| Yuji Kusu
| TKO (swollen eye)
| Shooto: Gig East 10
| 
| align=center| 2
| align=center| 3:47
| Tokyo, Japan
| 
|-
| Loss
| align=center| 2–1
| Hirofumi Hara
| TKO (punches)
| Shooto: Treasure Hunt 9
| 
| align=center| 1
| align=center| 4:34
| Tokyo, Japan
| 
|-
| Win
| align=center| 2–0
| Toru Nakayama
| Submission (triangle choke)
| Shooto: Treasure Hunt 4
| 
| align=center| 1
| align=center| 3:10
| Tokyo, Japan
| 
|-
| Win
| align=center| 1–0
| Takayuki Okochi
| Decision (unanimous)
| Shooto: GIG East 6
| 
| align=center| 2
| align=center| 5:00
| Tokyo, Japan
|

See also
 List of current mixed martial arts champions
 List of male mixed martial artists

References

External links
 
 

Living people
1976 births
Japanese male mixed martial artists
Lightweight mixed martial artists
Welterweight mixed martial artists
Mixed martial artists utilizing shootboxing
Mixed martial artists utilizing judo
Mixed martial artists utilizing Brazilian jiu-jitsu
Japanese male kickboxers
Middleweight kickboxers
Japanese male judoka
Japanese practitioners of Brazilian jiu-jitsu
People awarded a black belt in Brazilian jiu-jitsu
People from Yamaguchi Prefecture
Ultimate Fighting Championship male fighters